Quijote is a monotypic genus of gastropods belonging to the monotypic family Quijotidae. The only species is Quijote cervantesi.

References

Gastropods
Gastropods described in 2016